Helfenstein Castle represents the remnants of the fortified castle (burg) Helfenstein of the counts of Helfenstein located above the city of Geislingen an der Steige, Baden-Württemberg, Germany. It was destroyed in 1552.

See also
List of castles in Baden-Württemberg
House of Helfenstein

References

External links
 
 Ruine Helfenstein on Bergen Inventar.de 
 Ruine Helfenstein on Bergenwelt.de 

Ruined castles in Germany
Hill castles
Swabian Jura